The 1989 British Speedway Championship was the 29th edition of the British Speedway Championship. The Final took place on 21 May at Brandon in Coventry, England. The Championship was won by Simon Wigg, while Kelvin Tatum beat Alan Grahame in a run-off for second place.

Final 
21 May 1989
 Brandon Stadium, Coventry

{| width=100%
|width=50% valign=top|

See also 
 British Speedway Championship
 1989 Individual Speedway World Championship

References 

British Speedway Championship
Great Britain